Mingan River is a  salmon river of the Côte-Nord region of Quebec. It flows from north to south and empties into the Gulf of Saint Lawrence.

Location

The Mingan River's source is in the Canadian Shield.
For most of its length it runs through a rocky (granite) valley lined with fir and spruce.
Towards the end it flows between banks of sand and marble.
The course of the river from its source is fairly straight, apart from two large meanders before it enters its large estuary.

The river is navigable from its mouth to the rapids.
The river enters the Saint Lawrence opposite the Île du Havre de Mingan.
This island is at the west end of the Mingan Archipelago.
The river's mouth is just east of the Mingan Indian reserve.
It is in the municipality of Havre-Saint-Pierre in the Minganie Regional County Municipality.

Name

The name Mingan is thought to be of  Breton origin, meaning "white stone".
The river is identified on the 1775 map by John Mitchell.

Description

Basin

It is bordered to the west by the basin of the Saint-Jean River and on the east by the basin of the Romaine River.
The river basin is in the Minganie Regional County Municipality.
It is partly in the unorganized territory of Lac-Jérôme (71.1%) and partly in the municipalities of Havre-Saint-Pierre (16.5) and Longue-Pointe-de-Mingan (11.6). A small part of the basin is in the Mingan reserve (0.78%).

Terrain
The bulk of the watershed is on a high plateau that is slightly inclined towards the south and is deeply incised by alluvial valleys.

The bedrock is mainly magmatic, including an anorthositic massif and a smaller area of granitoid rocks.
The bedrock often shows in outcrops on the slopes and hilltops.
The main valleys hold glaciofluvial sediments and some eskers.
The coastal plain has large amounts of clay and silt deposited by the Goldthwait Sea after the glaciers retreated.
These fine sediments were then covered by coarser sandy deltaic and estuarine sediments.

Hydrology

The valleys of the streams and rivers conform to fractures in the hard bedrock, with straight-line sections intersecting at right angles.
In the plateau the rivers mostly flow in straight courses through old V-shaped valleys formed in the last glacial period.
The larger rivers in the center flow in more winding courses through U-shaped glacial valleys, and in places meander.
In its last section the Mingan River again follows a rectilinear course cut through the loose coastal sediments, then makes two large meanders before entering the Saint Lawrence.
The estuary is a submerged delta with multiple channels and shoals fed by erosion from the banks of the downstream part of the river.
When flow is low the salt waters can travel up the estuary  to the Quebec Route 138 bridge.

The Mingan is fed in the north by the Mingan Northwest and Mingan Northeast rivers.
A tributary that enters the east bank drains lakes Charles, Jérôme and Kleczkowski.
Waterfalls on the Mingan river include the Nakatshuan Mantu Hipis, Kakahtshekaut, Kastjekawt and Mingan Falls.
Water quality measurements in 1981-1985 at the Route 138 bridge showed the water was acidic but quality was satisfactory, the main problem being turbidity.

Water bodies cover 8.73% of the watershed in total.
Wetlands cover 1.81% of the watershed and are mainly ombrotrophic peatlands in the coastal plain. 
There are few wetlands in plateau or piedmont, which have few flat areas suitable for their formation.

Environment

A map of the ecological regions of Quebec shows the river in sub-regions 6j-T and 6m-T of the east spruce/moss subdomain.
Forests are dominated by black spruce (Picea mariana) and balsam fir (Abies balsamea), with a greater ratio of spruce to fir further north.
Other tree species include white spruce (Picea glauca), jack pine (Pinus banksiana), paper birch (Betula papyrifera) and trembling aspen (Populus tremuloides).
The forest is generally mature and virgin, with few fires and little forestry in recent decades, but there was a large infestation of hemlock looper moths (Lambdina fiscellaria) in the late 1980s, 1990s and early 2000s that caused considerable defoliation of the fir trees in the center of the basin.
There are three waterfowl conservation areas with IUCN category VI along the south of the watershed: the Mingan West Beach, Mingan River Beach and Île du Havre de Mingan.

Fish

Innu have long used the territory for hunting and fishing, and Europeans have been fishing for salmon since the start of the 19th century.
The Pourvoirie du Lac Allard et Rivière Mingan, which does not have exclusive rights, manages fishing on part of the river.

The river is known for Atlantic salmon (Salmo salar), and also has rainbow smelt (Osmerus mordax), brook trout (Salvelinus fontinalis), Atlantic sturgeon (Acipenser oxyrinchus oxyrinchus), northern pike (Esox lucius), lake whitefish (Coregonus clupeaformis) and brown trout (Salmo trutta).
Other species include round whitefish (Prosopium cylinraceum), lake trout (Salveninus namaycush), burbot (Lota lota), alewife (Alosa pseudoharengus), American shad (Alosa sapidissima), Atlantic tomcod (Microgadus tomcod) and American eel (Anguilla rostrata).

The number of salmon caught in the river declined during the early 2000s, indicating a declining population.
In November 2015 it was reported that the North Shore Atlantic Salmon Habitat Enhancement Program was contributing CDN$565,000 to the Ekuanitshit Innu Council and the Manitou-Mingan Outfitters for work to give the salmon easier access to spawning sites upstream from the falls, which the salmon struggle to mount.
The first phase had been started, and included a series of 14 connected basins as well as a flow control channel.
After completion the river above the first falls would provide 84% of the salmon potential in the river basin along  of the river.

Notes

Sources

Rivers of Côte-Nord